Shahrdari Tabriz Volleyball Club is a professional volleyball team based in Tabriz, Iran. They compete in the Iranian Volleyball Super League.

Current squad
Head Coach:  Adel Banakar

Honors
Iranian Super League
Third place (1): 2018

References

 Rosters

External links
 Official Website (Persian)

Iranian volleyball clubs
Shahrdari Tabriz